Baadur Tsuladze ( 5 March 1935 – 13 May 2018) was a Georgian actor, film director, writer and broadcaster. Honored Artist of the Georgian SSR (1979).

Biography 
In 1961, Tsuladze graduated from the Directing Department of VGIK (workshop of Alexander Dovzhenko and Mikheil Chiaureli). Actor and director of the film studio Kartuli Pilmi. He worked as the director of dubbing. President of the Screen Actors Guild of Georgia, Member of the Board of the Union of Cinematographers of Georgia. She teaches acting at the Institute of Theatre and Cinema of Shota Rustaveli.

Baadur Tsuladze was a former presenter of culinary transmission on Georgian TV.

Death
Tsuladze died on 13 May 2018 in Tbilisi. He never married and had no children.

Selected filmography

as actor
 1954 —  Strekoza as Professor
 1966 —  Falling Leaves as Archil
1966 —  He Did Not Want Тo Кill as Khvicha
 1968 —  Serenada as warehouse worker
1969 —  Do Not Worry! as Vano, fisherman
1971 —  I, The Investigator as Vaso Kobidze
 1973 —  Melodies of Vera Quarter as politsmeyster
 1975 —  The Adventures of Buratino as the owner of the inn
1977 —  Love at First Sight as gardener
 1977 —  Night Over Chile as Mary's husband
 1978 —  The Comedy of Errors as Balthazar
 1979 —  The Gypsy as seller caps
 1980 —  Teheran 43 as Deryush
 1984 —  The Blonde Around the Corner as Rashid Rashidovich
 1993 —  The Alaska Kid as Carlucci
 2000 —  27 Missing Kisses   as Miki's friend grandfather
 2005 —  Tbilisi — Tbilisi as Professor Otar Eristavi
as director
1962 —  Three Songs
1965 — Nagrada
1970 — Feola
1972 — Gladiator
1975 — Waltz on Mtatsminda
1978 — Break
1980 — Good Luck
1982 — For Lovers To Solve Crosswords
1986 — Our Тurn, Guys!
as screenwriter
1982 — For Lovers To Solve Crosswords

References

External links

1935 births
2018 deaths
People from Batumi
Soviet male actors
20th-century male actors from Georgia (country)
21st-century male actors from Georgia (country)
Soviet film directors
Film directors from Georgia (country)
Gerasimov Institute of Cinematography alumni
Screenwriters from Georgia (country)